Gholamali Pouratayi (in Persian: غلام‌علی پورعطایی - born 1941 in Mahmoud Abad, Torbat-e Jam, Iran; died 4 October 2014) was an Iranian Mugham singer and Dotar player.

References

20th-century Iranian male singers
2014 deaths
1941 births